Wolfgang Amadeus Mozart's Piano Sonata No. 15 in F major, KV 533/494 (finished 3 January 1788) is a sonata in three movements:

A typical performance takes about 23 minutes.

The Rondo was originally a stand-alone piece composed by Mozart in 1786 (Rondo No. 2, K. 494 in the Köchel catalogue). In 1788, Mozart wrote the first two movements of K. 533 and incorporated a revised version of K. 494 as the finale, having lengthened it in order to provide a more substantial counterpart to the other two movements.

Other arrangements 
Edvard Grieg arranged this sonata for 2 pianos, by adding further accompaniment on the secondo part, whilst the primo part plays the original. This attempt to "impart to several of Mozart's sonatas a tonal effect appealing to our modern ears" serves to document the taste of Grieg's late nineteenth-century Norwegian audience. A notable recording is that of Elisabeth Leonskaja accompanied by Sviatoslav Richter.

Notes

External links 
 
 
 Performance of Piano Sonata No. 15 by Jonathan Biss from the Isabella Stewart Gardner Museum in MP3 format

Piano Sonata 15
Compositions in F major
1788 compositions